Valaikaappu  (வளைகாப்பு) is a prenatal ceremony or celebration similar to baby-shower, held by South Indian women in Tamil Nadu, and Telangana, meant to bless a pregnant woman, celebrate her fertility, and prepare the baby and mother-to-be for a safe birth. It is typically held at the 7th month or the 9th month of the pregnancy. It is widely practiced among both the urban and rural populations of the region.

Etymology 
The etymology could be related to two Tamil words that mean bangles: valaiyal (வளையல்) which is typically a glass bangle, and kaapu (காப்பு), which is often thicker and made of copper or gold.

History 
It is related to the more formal traditions of Seemantham and Simantonnayana dating back to the 4th century BCE, documented in the Kalpa Sutras, possibly part of the Jain (Mahavira) and the slightly later, but contemporary, Buddhism traditions (dated earliest to 6th century BCE). It is practiced widely in South India. Valaikaappu was originally a simple ceremony, mainly limited to the exchange of bangles. But as Valaikaappu became more widely practiced, it grew more lavish, and since the 1980s has been celebrated more widely, according to anthropologists who have studied the practice. It is conducted with "magnificence and sumptuousness", with gifts including jewelry, saris, household appliances, and gold ornaments.

Purpose 
The mother-to-be's wrists are adorned with glass bangles (red and green) in odd numbers. It is believed that the bangle sound induces the child's senses and brain activity. It is also well-known that fetal hearing begins in the 7th month. Women at the ceremony sing hymns and songs. A paste made of sandalwood and turmeric is applied to the mother-to-be's hands and face to reduce the body heat and calm the mother and baby from fear and anxiety of child birth. The guests then place a garland and bangles on her wrists, shower her with flowers, and bestow well-wishes and prayers for a safe delivery. Another purpose of the ceremony is to honor and protect the pregnant woman, who is seen as vulnerable to the evil eye, malign spirits and ghosts, and to ensure the birth of a healthy child. After the celebration, the mother-to-be rests at her parents' home for the final weeks of her pregnancy.

Food at the ceremony 
According to some Tamil traditions, the mother-to-be is served seven types of rice and sweets. Rice types include tamarind rice, lemon rice, curd rice, mango rice, mint rice, tomato rice, and coconut rice. Sweets served include a variety of payasams (javarisi, paruppu payasam), fruit salad, and sweets like bengal gram laddu, multigrain laddu and gulab jamoon. A healthful laddu made of ginger, palm jaggery (karupetti), omam (carom), and other items is served for good digestion. The feast is centered on the health of the child and the mother-to-be, and not the guests. Vegetarian food is usually served to the guests mainly consisting of rice, sambhar, 3 types of vegetables and a dessert.

Similar ceremonies 
Similar ceremonies are held in other parts of India and in Pakistan, including among Bengali (who call it Shaadh), Marathi and Konkani women (who call the ceremony Dohale Jevan [डोहाळे जेवण]), Punjabi women (who call it Godh-Bharai), Sindhi women, and Marwari women. It is similar in concept to Baby Shower.

Gallery

References

Maternity in India
Tamil culture